Sanskruti Sanjay Balgude (born 19 December 1992) is an Indian actress who appears in the Marathi language entertainment industry. Balgude is best known for her film Sarva Line Vyasta Ahet. She made her debut in the Marathi TV show Pinjara (2011) which aired on Zee Marathi.

Personal life 
Sanskruti was born on 19 December 1992 in Pune, Maharashtra. Her father name is Sanjay Balgude and mother name is Sanjivani Balgude.

Filmography

Television

References

External links 
Sanskruti on Instagram

Living people
Marathi actors
Indian actresses
People from Maharashtra
Actresses in Marathi cinema
1992 births